The Cut Bank Ranger Station in Glacier National Park was one of the first buildings built in Glacier by the National Park Service. Built in 1917, the design is in keeping with park hotel structures built by the Great Northern Railway in a Swiss chalet style that predated the fully developed National Park Service Rustic style.

The station was manned year-round until the late 1930s when it became a summer-only station. It was one of the first National Park Service-built facilities in Glacier. The design pre-dates the standardized National Park Service Rustic style, using a similar but simplified construction technique resembling pioneer construction. It is similar to the Saint Mary Ranger Station.

A barn was added in 1935 by Civilian Conservation Corps labor, along with a woodshed. Both structures were built to adaptations of Park Service standard designs.

References

Ranger stations in Glacier National Park (U.S.)
Park buildings and structures on the National Register of Historic Places in Montana
Government buildings completed in 1906
Swiss Chalet Revival architecture
Civilian Conservation Corps in Montana
Historic districts on the National Register of Historic Places in Montana
National Register of Historic Places in Glacier County, Montana
1906 establishments in Montana
National Register of Historic Places in Glacier National Park